Enrico Casarosa (born November 20, 1971) is an Italian-American storyboard artist, film director, and writer who works at Pixar. In 2012, he was nominated for an Academy Award for the animated short film La Luna. In 2022, he was nominated for the Academy Award for Best Animated Feature for Luca (2021).

Early life 
Casarosa was born in Genoa, Italy, and moved to New York City in his twenties, to study animation at the School of Visual Arts and Illustration at the Fashion Institute of Technology.

Career 
He then worked as a background designer and storyboard artist on various Disney Channel TV series, including 101 Dalmatians: The Series and PB&J Otter. Before joining Pixar, Casarosa worked as a storyboard artist at Blue Sky Studios on Ice Age.

In 2002, Casarosa joined Pixar, where he worked as a story artist on Cars, Ratatouille, Up and Cars 2. In late 2004, Casarosa started a drawing marathon community called SketchCrawl and has been organizing the event ever since. In 2011, his short film La Luna premiered at the Annecy International Animated Film Festival in France, and was released theatrically with Pixar's Brave in 2012. 

He then worked as head of story on The Good Dinosaur when Bob Peterson was directing the project beginning in 2011, and as a story artist on Coco. 

Casarosa most recently directed the Pixar Animation Studios film Luca, released on Disney+ on June 18, 2021, in the United States. The film received generally positive reviews from critics for its nostalgic feel and acting and the film won a Hollywood Critics Association award for Best Picture.

In October 2022, Cararosa was confirmed to be developing another original Pixar feature film.

Filmography

Films

Shorts

Featurettes and TV

Bibliography

 The Adventures of Mia, Volume One (2001) graphic novel
 Fragments (2001) art book with Ronnie Del Carmen
 The Adventures of Mia, Volume Two (2004) graphic novel
 Fragments Intermezzo (2004) art book
 Flight, Volume One (2004) part of a larger comic anthology
 Three Trees Make a Forest (2007) exhibition art book with Ronnie Del Carmen and Tadahiro Uesugi
 Totoro Forest Project (2008) with Daisuke Tsutsumi, Ronnie Del Carmen, and Yukino Pang
 The Venice Chronicles (2008)
 Disney Picture Book: La Luna (2012) in support of La Luna
 Disney Pixar: The Art of Luca (2021) in support of Luca

Awards and nominations

Special projects
In 2008, Enrico Casarosa (along with Ronnie del Carmen, Daisuke Tsutsumi and Yukino Pang) initiated the Totoro Forest Project, a fundraising exhibition/auction to support the non-profit Totoro Forest Foundation. This initiative also produced a corresponding art book reprinting the various pieces contributed and included the likes of James Jean, Charles Vess, Iain McCaig and William Joyce among others.

References

External links

 

1971 births
Fashion Institute of Technology alumni
Italian emigrants to the United States
Italian film directors
Living people
Film people from Genoa
Pixar people
School of Visual Arts alumni
Italian storyboard artists
Blue Sky Studios people